Tellow-e Bala (also Romanized as Tellow-e Bālā, Talū Bālā, and Tellow Bālā; also known as Tellow) is a village in Siyahrud Rural District, in the Central District of Tehran County, Tehran Province, Iran. At the 2006 census, its population was 23, in 14 families.

References 

Populated places in Tehran County